Irvin Kershner (born Isadore Kershner; April 29, 1923November 27, 2010) was an American film director, actor, and producer of film and television.

He gained notice early in his career as a filmmaker for directing quirky, independent drama films, while working as an influential lecturer at the University of Southern California. Later in his career, he transitioned to high-budget blockbusters such as The Empire Strikes Back, the James Bond adaptation Never Say Never Again and RoboCop 2. Through the course of his career, he received numerous accolades, including being nominated for both a Primetime Emmy Award and a Palme d'Or.

Early life
Irvin Kershner was born in Philadelphia, to Russian-Jewish parents. They were born in Kyiv, Russian Empire. His artistic and cultural background was a mixture of music and art. The study of music (violin, viola and composition) was the most important activity of his early years. He attended Temple University's Tyler School of Fine Arts in Philadelphia. Later, he went to New York and Provincetown to study with the famous painting teacher Hans Hofmann. He then moved to Los Angeles where he studied photography at the Art Center College of Design.

During World War II, Kershner served three years with the U.S. Eighth Air Force as a flight engineer. He later began his film career at the University of Southern California School of Cinematic Arts, teaching photography and taking cinema courses under Slavko Vorkapić, a montage artist and then-dean of the School. Kershner then accepted a job as still photographer on a State Department film project in Iran under the Point Four Program, which ultimately led to an assignment as a director and cinematographer of documentaries in Iran, Greece and Turkey with the United States Information Service.

Career
When he returned to the States, he and Paul Coates (1921–1968) developed Confidential File, a documentary television series. Kershner worked as writer, director, cinematographer and editor. He later developed and directed the television series The Rebel (1959–61), as well as the pilots for Peyton Place, Cain's Hundred, Philip Marlowe, and others.

He then moved on to feature films, including: Hoodlum Priest (which starred Don Murray); The Luck of Ginger Coffey (with Robert Shaw and Mary Ure); A Fine Madness (with Sean Connery, Joanne Woodward, and Jean Seberg); The Flim-Flam Man (starring George C. Scott); Up the Sandbox (with Barbra Streisand); Loving (with George Segal and Eva Marie Saint); The Return of a Man Called Horse (starring Richard Harris); the critically acclaimed TV movie Raid on Entebbe (a true-life drama which was nominated for nine Emmys, including Best Direction); and the supernatural thriller Eyes of Laura Mars (starring Faye Dunaway and Tommy Lee Jones).

Kershner was the son of Jewish immigrants. He considered himself an internationalist, saying: "I've been a student of Christianity. I've been interested in the historical basis of the Muslim religion. I studied Buddhism. I don't think of myself as a Jew except by birth, as I don't follow the customs. I'm a Jew because other people consider me so. My pride is in being international."

The Empire Strikes Back
Kershner directed The Empire Strikes Back (1980), the sequel of the 1977 hit film Star Wars. Writer-producer George Lucas knew Kershner as a teacher in the film program at USC School of Cinematic Arts. Kershner was a surprising choice in directing the film. According to Kershner himself, he once asked Lucas: "Of all the younger guys around, all the hot-shots, why me?" Lucas replied: "Well, because you know everything a Hollywood director is supposed to know, but you're not Hollywood."

Kershner, who was an appealing directorial candidate to Lucas because of his concern for character development, was at first reluctant to direct the film. When asked by Lucas to work on the project over lunch, Kershner refused. Kershner's agent was told about the meeting and encouraged him to take the job. Kershner later discussed his motivations: "I was grabbed by the fairytale which Lucas invented and wanted to be part of keeping it alive." Of his cinematic style, Kershner has said: "I like to fill up the frame with the characters' faces. There's nothing more interesting than the landscape of the human face".

Kershner turned down a chance to direct Return of the Jedi (1983), having spent almost three years of work on The Empire Strikes Back. Richard Marquand was eventually chosen to direct the third film in the original trilogy. Kershner stated, in retrospect, that he would have accepted an offer to direct one of the films of the Star Wars prequel trilogy had they been produced sooner, as Lucas originally estimated the first of them to be ready for release in 1988 rather than in 1999.

Later work
Kershner had projects that he was going to be involved with in the late 70s and early 80s. He signed on to direct an adaptation of I, Robot from a script by Harlan Ellison, which was never filmed. Later, he was initially hired by producers Richard Zanuck and David Brown to direct an adaptation of Eric Van Lustbader's novel The Ninja from scripts by W.D. Richter and Tom Cole, but the project was cancelled following months of pre-production.

After Empire Strikes Back, Kershner directed Never Say Never Again (Sean Connery's return to the role of James Bond), the HBO film Traveling Man (starring John Lithgow and Jonathan Silverman, this film earned Kershner an ACE Award nomination), and RoboCop 2. He also directed the pilot of the television series seaQuest DSV, and he made his debut as an actor in the Martin Scorsese film The Last Temptation of Christ (1988), in which he played Zebedee, the father of the apostles James and John. He played a film director in Steven Seagal's On Deadly Ground. He was a faculty member at the Master of Professional Writing Program at the University of Southern California. In 2000, he was a member of the jury at the 22nd Moscow International Film Festival.

In fall 2002, spring 2003, fall 2004, and spring 2004, Kershner served as a Visiting Professor and Research Associate at the Maryland Institute for Technology in the Humanities (MITH) at the University of Maryland, College Park, where he also provided cinematography training. He and the founding director Martha Nell Smith remained close and he served as her advisor until the end of his life.

Death
Kershner died on November 27, 2010, at his home in Los Angeles, after a -year battle with lung cancer. Kershner had been working on photographic projects before his death. He was survived by two sons, David and Dana.

Filmography

Film

As director

As actor

As producer

Television director

Bibliography 

 1980: Alan Arnold: A Journal of the Making of The Empire Strikes Back (contributor). .
 1997: Laurent Bouzereau: Star Wars. The Annotated Screenplays. (contributor) .

Awards and nominations
 Winner, Lifetime Career Award – Saturn Awards (2010)
 Winner, Director of Achievement – Fort Lauderdale International Film Festival (2002)
 Winner, Best Director, The Empire Strikes Back – Saturn Awards (1980)
 Winner, Best Dramatic Presentation, The Empire Strikes Back – Hugo Awards (1980)
 Nominee, Best Director, Special Program-Drama, Raid on Entebbe – Emmy Awards (1976)
 Winner, OCIC Award, Hoodlum Priest – Cannes Film Festival (1961)
 Nominee, Palme d'Or, Hoodlum Priest – Cannes Film Festival (1961)

References

External links
 
 
 

1923 births
2010 deaths
American male film actors
American film directors
American film producers
American people of Ukrainian-Jewish descent
American television directors
Deaths from lung cancer in California
Giallo film directors 
Artists from Philadelphia
Hugo Award winners
Science fiction film directors
Temple University Tyler School of Art alumni
USC School of Cinematic Arts faculty
The Empire Strikes Back
USC School of Cinematic Arts alumni
1980s Italian films